This list of rivers of Issyk Kul includes rivers draining into lake Issyk-Kul in Kyrgyzstan. It is reported  that the basin of Issyk-Kul encounter 1,976 river and streams with a total length of 7,139 km. Of them, 1,842 streams are shorter than 10 km with a total length of 4,241 km (or 59%), and 106 streams range from 10 to 25 km  in length totaling 1,708 km (or 24%). There are 24 small rivers with length varying between 25 and 50 km (the total is 853 km or 12%), and 3 medium-size rivers (51–100 km ) with a total length of 217 km (4%). Finally, there is only one comparatively large Tyup river with a length of 120 km, which is 1% of total length. Overall, 118 streams and rivers flow into the lake.

In the table below, the rivers are listed clockwise from the northeast.

References